Uncial 0315 (in the Gregory-Aland numbering), is a Greek uncial manuscript of the New Testament. Palaeographically it has been assigned to the 4th or 5th-century.

The codex contains a small text of the Gospel of Mark 2:9.21.25; 3:1-2, on one fragment of the one parchment leaf. The original size of the leaf was 29 by 20 cm (or 22 cm).

The text is written in two columns per page, probably in 32 lines per page, in small uncial letters.

It is currently housed at the Christopher de Hamel Collection (Gk. Ms. 5) in Cambridge.

See also 
 List of New Testament uncials
 Biblical manuscript
 Textual criticism

References

Further reading 
 Peter M. Head, "Five New Testament Manuscripts: Recently Discovered Fragments in a Private Collection in Cambridge", JTS, NS, 2008.

External links 
 Images from Uncial 0315 at the CSNTM
 "Continuation of the Manuscript List", Institute for New Testament Textual Research, University of Münster. Retrieved April 9, 2008

Greek New Testament uncials
4th-century biblical manuscripts